Loi Wai Long is a Macau footballer who plays as a defender for the club CD Monte Carlo. He is the elder brother of Loi Wai Hong.

References 

Living people
1989 births
Macau footballers
Macau international footballers
C.D. Monte Carlo players
Association football defenders